José Manuel Pérez may refer to:
José Manuel Pérez (bobsleigh) (born 1947), Spanish bobsledder
José Manuel Pérez-Muñoz (born 1978), Spanish composer
José Manuel Pérez-Aicart (born 1982), Spanish racing driver
José Manuel Pérez (footballer) (born 1985), Spanish footballer

See also
José Pérez (disambiguation)